Xi Hydrae, Latinised from ξ Hydrae, is a solitary star in the equatorial constellation of Hydra. It was also given the Flamsteed designation 19 Crateris. This magnitude 3.54 star is situated 130 light-years from Earth and has a radius about 10 times that of the Sun. It is radiating 58 times as much luminosity as the Sun.

Flamsteed gave Xi Hydrae the designation 19 Crateris. He included a number of stars now within the IAU boundaries of Hydra as part of a Hydra & Crater constellation overlapping parts of both modern constellations.

The star Xi Hydrae is particularly interesting in the field of asteroseismology since it shows solar-like oscillations. Multiple frequency oscillations are found with periods between 2.0 and 5.5 hours.

Xi Hydrae has left the main sequence, having exhausted the supply of hydrogen in its core. Its spectrum is that of a red giant.

References

External links
 Wisky.org Star Catalogue
 ESO Article: The Ultrabass Sounds of the Giant Star Xi Hya.
 Listen to Xi Hya (wav).

Hydrae, Xi
Hydra (constellation)
Hydrae, 288
100407
056343
4450
Crateris, 19
Durchmusterung objects
G-type giants